The National Dodgeball League (NDL) the only professional dodgeball league in the United States. The league was founded in 2004 and is currently headed by Commissioner Edward Prentiss out of Hopkins, MN. The league is composed of 24 professional teams, which are divided into the National and the American Dodgeball Conferences. In addition to professional dodgeball, the NDL hosts the annual amateur Dodgeball World Championship (DWC) in Las Vegas, Nevada. The DWC draws dodgeball players from across the globe to compete in a tournament to determine the best amateur dodgeball team in the world. Prior DWC tournaments have included teams from Canada, Denmark, United Kingdom, Japan, New Zealand, and Australia.

NDL Amateur Association

The NDL Amateur Association holds an amateur dodgeball season year round via the NDL Championship Tour. The amateur dodgeball season is composed of nationwide tournaments, and culminates with the Dodgeball World Championship (DWC). Once the DWC concludes, a new amateur season begins. Tournaments, also called tour stops, are held at various locations and times throughout the year. Each tour stop is formatted as a tournament between other amateur teams where winners gain points towards their national rank. Any amateur team may enter any and/or all of the Championship Tour tournaments, including the DWC. No prior qualification is necessary. Professional players in the NDL are required to attend any tour stops located nearby and manage the tournament.

Amateur dimensions
There are several divisions that players may participate in. Players are permitted to compete with multiple teams, but not within the same division. Players must be at least 16 years of age unless in the youth division.

Open Stinger
Played with four 8.5" rubber dodgeballs and two 5" rubber stingers. Teams may consist of any combination of men and women.

Open 8.5
Played with six 8.5" rubber dodgeballs. Teams may consist of any combination of men and women.

Open 8.5 No Blocking
Played with six 8.5" rubber dodgeballs. Teams may consist of any combination of men and women. Blocking live dodgeballs with a dodgeball in your hand is not allowed and results in the blocking player being called out.

Co-ed 8.5
Played with six 8.5" rubber dodgeballs. A team must have at least 2 women playing in each game or have 1 play but be limited to a total of 5 players in that game instead of the usual 6.

Women's 8.5
Played with six 8.5" rubber dodgeballs. Teams must consist of women only.

Open No Sting
Played with six 8" no sting (typically foam) dodgeballs. Teams may consist of any combination of men and women.

Co-ed No Sting
Played with six 8" no sting (typically foam) dodgeballs. A team must have at least 2 women playing in each game or have 1 play but be limited to a total of 5 players in that game instead of the usual 6.

Co-ed No Sting No Blocking
Played with six 8" no sting (typically foam) dodgeballs. A team must have at least 2 women playing in each game or have 1 play but be limited to a total of 5 players in that game instead of the usual 6. Blocking live dodgeballs with a dodgeball in your hand is not allowed and results in the blocking player being called out.

Women's No Sting
Played with six 8" no sting (typically foam) dodgeballs. Teams must consist of women only.

Trampoline
Played on a trampoline dodgeball court with five 8.5" rubber dodgeballs. Teams may consist of any combination of men and women.

Recreational
A division where emphasis is taken away from winning the dodgeball game and placed on having fun. Teams earn points in categories such as Team Entrance, Team Uniform, Team Mascot, Celebrity Look-alike, Best Hair, Sportsmanship, and many more. The team accumulating the most points at the conclusion of dodgeball matches is declared the winner.

Youth Division
Not included as part of the Dodgeball World Championship, but available in other annual NDL tournaments. Players may range from 11 to 14 and 15 to 17 years of age in any gender combination.

Rules
The NDL Amateur Association follows the same National Dodgeball League rules used in professional dodgeball. The rule is to eliminate the players on the other team. Headshots result in the thrower to be ejected from the game. The game is over when a whole team is eliminated from the game.

Dodgeball World Championship and Convention
The NDL's annual Dodgeball World Championship & Convention (DWC) is held in Las Vegas and hosts the Amateur World Championships, the NDL Dodgeballer Awards & Banquet, and the professional teams' regular season over the course of several days in August. As of 2013, the first three days (Thursday - Saturday) are dedicated to the amateur teams and consist of round-robin play, a seeded single-elimination tournament for each division, and the Last Dodgeballer Standing competition. The evening events include the NDL Dodgeballer Awards & Banquet where the previous year's amateur and professional winners are honored. The final day (Sunday) is composed of professional team tryouts followed by the professional regular season and championship game.

Last Dodgeballer Standing
Last Dodgeballer Standing is a planned game involving all NDL participants and is essentially a large free-for-all version of dodgeball. All players are put in a sufficiently sized, self-contained playing area along with a pre-determined number of dodgeballs. To combat collusion among friends, the Last Dodgeballer Standing event format changes and evolves each year.

Last Dodgeballer Standing Rules
Play starts with all players standing along the walls of the play area followed by a scramble for the dodgeballs.

A player may only hold one dodgeball at a time.

If a player is holding a dodgeball, that player is restricted to a limited range of movement. The player may only take a certain number of steps, usually starting with 2 and, as other players are eliminated, lengthened to 3, 4, etc. and eventually free to run.

Each player is allowed to be "out" twice before eliminated from the game with each out generally marked upon the player's hand with a marker. An out counts as either being hit with a dodgeball or having your throw caught by another player.

The last player left is the winner and deemed the Last Dodgeballer Standing. The Last Dodgeballer Standing receives a championship belt and will have their silhouette placed in the next year's Last Dodgeballer Standing logo.

NDL Professional League

History
The NDL Professional league was formed in 2004. The league was split into two conferences, the American Conference and the National Conference, with each conference consisting of four teams. Each team played the other teams in their respective conference three times.

In 2009, the league experimented with playing a new version of the game involving smaller court sizes, timed games, and a point system. Teams were reduced to four court players (to accommodate the smaller court size) and points were awarded for player eliminations, catches, sacrifices, and victories. The point system placed an emphasis on team victories and performing successful individual sacrifice attacks. As a result, the speed of play increased and the common slow-play tactic of stalling was discouraged. In response to the smaller teams and growth of the league, four new teams were added. The American Conference added the Missouri Explosion, and the National Conference added the Dallas Doberman, Houston Bounty Hunters, and Las Vegas Vipers.

In 2010, a similar game format to 2009 was used. However, rather than placing all three balls at the center line for the opening rush, each team began the game with one ball in hand, and only one ball was placed at the center line. Further growth led to the addition of the Boston Undertakers, Memphis Men In Black, Pittsburgh Punishers and Virginia Rampage to the American Conference, and the Arizona Resistance and Minnesota Blur to the National Conference.

In 2011, a tournament style random draw double elimination bracket was used. Each team was randomly drawn from a hat and seeded in the double elimination bracket. Each dodgeball match consisted of a three-game series. The point system of prior years was not used in this format, rather, the first team to eliminate all of the opposing players was declared the winner. The first team to win two games advanced, and the losing team fell to the loser's bracket. The loser's bracket was also a best of three series, and if a team lost their loser's bracket match they were eliminated from the tournament. To accommodate the growth of the league five new teams were added. The American Conference added the Austin Matadors and Philadelphia Justice. The National Conference added the Portland Minotaurs, Toronto Gryphons, and Washington Buzzsaw.

In 2012, the number of players on each team increased from four to six and the court size was expanded to allow more room for the additional players. The number of dodgeballs in play increased to four. Each team began with two dodgeballs in their possession and the rush was eliminated. Blocking was eliminated to speed up the game. The Pro teams from prior years were consolidated into six teams, and a new team, the New York Guardians, was established as the 7th team. All teams competed in a round robin format with each team playing each other once in a best of three series. Teams were seeded based on their win–loss record to face off in a single elimination playoff with each match again a best of three series.

Regular season
Unlike most other sports leagues, the NDL holds its entire regular season in one day during its annual Dodgeball World Championship & Convention held in Las Vegas, Nevada. Each teams plays three regular season five-minute matches. Throughout the match, teams score points by winning games and eliminating opposing players. The top teams from each Conference are determined first by matches won, then by head-to-head points, and finally by total season points. The top four teams in each Conference advance to the playoffs.

Rules
The National Dodgeball League has created their own National Dodgeball League rules for professional dodgeball competition.

Teams

Championships
2019

By team

References
1. The Official Website of the NDL

2. NDL Dodgeball World Championship Home Page

Sports leagues in the United States